Galaxy 23 is the name given to the C-band service of the Galaxy 23/EchoStar 9 communications satellite jointly owned by Intelsat and EchoStar located at 121° W longitude, serving the North American market. It was built by Space Systems/Loral, as part of its FS-1300 line. Galaxy 23 was formerly known as Intelsat Americas 13. The "Galaxy 23" portion of the service provides transponders in the C band. The "EchoStar 9" portion broadcasts Ku band, and Ka band transponders.

While the satellite itself is jointly owned through a partnership between Intelsat and Echostar, the Ku band payload is owned and operated by Echostar for international television programming and local television channels. That service is intended for Dish Network customers using a SuperDish system. The C-band payload is owned and operated by Intelsat. The Ka band payload is owned and operated by Echostar for as-yet-undisclosed purposes.

Current clients for Galaxy 23/EchoStar 9 include Dish Network, Direct TV, Genesis Networks, and Playboy.

References

External links

Galaxy 23 on IMS

Intelsat satellites
Communications satellites in geostationary orbit
Satellite television
Satellites using the SSL 1300 bus